Headnoise is a Slovenian feature film by the director Andrej Košak, featuring Jernej Šugman in the main role. It was released in 2002. It was edited by Jurij Moškon, who received the Best Cinematography Award at the Cologne Mediterranean Film Festival for it.

Plot
In 1970 Yugoslavia, inmates at the Livada prison led by an inmate named Keber convince reluctant prison guards to let them watch a televised game of the 1970 FIBA World Championship between Yugoslavia and the United States. However, taunting guards interrupt the viewing and provoke the prisoners to the point of rioting. After a period of a kind of blissful anarchy where the inmates taste freedom, Keber enlists the house "intellectual" Mrak to devise a system of prisoner self-government aimed at forcing reforms upon the state.

Reception
The film was selected as a Slovenian submission to the 75th Academy Awards for Best Foreign Language Film, but did not get nominated.

References

External links
 
 Headnoise at the Slovenian film fund

2002 films
Films set in 1970
Films set in Yugoslavia
Slovenian thriller films
Slovene-language films